Charlottesville is the name of  places that have usually been named after Charlotte of Mecklenburg-Strelitz, the queen consort of United Kingdom's King George III (1738–1820).

Charlottesville may refer to:

Places 
 Charlottesville, Indiana
 Charlottesville, Union County, Indiana
 Charlottesville, Virginia
 Charlottesville, VA MSA, a U.S. Metropolitan Statistical Area in Virginia

Facilities 
 Charlottesville-Albemarle Airport, Virginia
 Charlottesville (Amtrak station), the Union Station; Charlottesville, VA
 Charlottesville Catholic School; Charlottesville, VA
 Charlottesville Fashion Square; Charlottesville, VA
 Charlottesville High School; Charlottesville, VA

Other uses 
 USS Charlottesville (PF-25), U.S Navy frigate
 Charlottesville (horse)
 a metonym for the Unite the Right rally in Charlottesville, Virginia in August 2017.

See also 
 Charlotteville (disambiguation)